"Breakfast in Bed" is a soul–R&B song written by Muscle Shoals songwriters Eddie Hinton and Donnie Fritts for Dusty Springfield. It takes a knowing spin on the line "You Don't Have to Say You Love Me", the title of a song that had previously been a number one hit for her in the UK. After being released on her 1969 album Dusty in Memphis, it was recorded and popularized the same year by Baby Washington.

Harry J produced three reggae versions in 1972: Lorna Bennett; Scotty; Bongo Herman (see list below).

Springfield's version was featured in the 2014 movie Godzilla.

Selected list of recorded versions
 1969 Dusty Springfield on the album Dusty in Memphis
 1979 Sheila Hylton; reached #57 in the UK Singles Chart in 1979
 1988 UB40 (featuring Chrissie Hynde) on their self-titled album; reached #6 in the UK charts.

References

External links
 Eddie Hinton bio

1969 songs
Dusty Springfield songs
UB40 songs
Songs written by Donnie Fritts
Atlantic Records singles
Philips Records singles
1988 singles